Devil May Care (May 7, 2007 – May 4, 2011) was an American Thoroughbred racehorse.

Out of the mare Kelli's Ransom, Devil May Care was sired by Malibu Moon, a son of the multiple Grade I winner, A.P. Indy. She was owned by Glencrest Farms and trained by Todd Pletcher

Devil May Care won the Grade I Frizette Stakes at two.  At three, she found her form again when she upset the favorite in the 2010 Bonnie Miss Stakes. Devil May Care was the only filly entered in the 2010 Kentucky Derby, going off at odds of 10:1.  She finished 10th behind the winner Super Saver. 
 
The daughter of Malibu Moon returned on June 26, 2010, to win the Mother Goose Stakes in fine style, covering the 1 1/16 distance in a record time of 1:42.06. Devil May Care was euthanized on May 4, 2011 after a confirmed diagnosis of lymphosarcoma, a form of cancer.

Career statistics

External links
equibase.com data
 Devil May Care's pedigree and partial racing stats

2007 racehorse births
2011 racehorse deaths
Racehorses bred in Kentucky
Racehorses trained in the United States
Thoroughbred family 4-m